Štavica may refer to:
 Štavica, Prilep, North Macedonia
 Štavica (Ljig), Serbia